Upright and Wing, also referred to as Temple and Wing or Gable Front and Wing, is a residential architectural style found in American vernacular architecture. It was popular from the mid- to late 19th century and is typified by a gable ended "upright" section, usually two stories, and a one-story ell or "wing" section.

Characteristics and elements

As a type of non-stylistic folk architecture, Upright and Wing houses were generally designed and built by tradesmen as opposed to the owners of the houses. Most Upright and Wing houses are characterized by four main traits. Nearly all are 1½–2 stories, gable roofed, and feature a vertical upright portion that is usually two stories and a perpendicular side section known as the wing. The wing is an ell that is generally 1 story but can be the same height as the upright section.

Though usually non-stylistic, there are minor variations within the style. Upright and Wing houses were laid out in either an L-plan or T-plan. The ell usually has bedrooms and the kitchen while the upright holds a parlor, staircase, and additional bedrooms. Early examples (c.1830–50) have the main entry on the upright portion of the house. Post-1850 examples usually shifted the entryway to the ell portion of the house.

Upright and Wing enjoyed a lengthy period of popularity which partially coincided with the popularity of Greek Revival architecture in the United States. Thus, Upright and Wing houses are often adorned with pilasters, cornice returns and wide entablatures.

Prominence

The Upright and Wing style was mostly associated with New England and the New Englanders who settled the Great Lakes region. A folk style that was developed for the rural settings, Upright and Wing enjoyed wide usage in both rural and urban settings. The style was popular for much of the 19th century spanning a time period from c. 1830–90. The form is known as Temple and Wing in some academic circles.

See also
Gablefront house

Notes

House styles
American architectural styles